Dimosthenis 'Dimos' Chantzaras (born 8 January 1997) is a Greek professional footballer who plays as a winger.

Honours
Veria
Gamma Ethniki: 2018–19

References

1997 births
Living people
Greek footballers
Greece youth international footballers
Greek expatriate footballers
Super League Greece players
Cypriot First Division players
Football League (Greece) players
Gamma Ethniki players
Olympiacos F.C. players
AC Omonia players
Anagennisi Karditsa F.C. players
Panathinaikos F.C. players
A.E. Sparta P.A.E. players
Veria F.C. players
Association football wingers
Footballers from Giannitsa